The Best of KC and the Sunshine Band is a compilation album by KC and the Sunshine Band, released in 1990. The album contained hits from 1974 to 1979, including every track included in their 1980 Greatest Hits compilation (which had gone out of print), along with their top 20 1983 hit "Give It Up" and other moderately successful singles.

Track listing
"Sound Your Funky Horn" – 3:05
"Get Down Tonight" – 3:12
"I'm Your Boogie Man" – 4:03
"(Shake, Shake, Shake) Shake Your Booty" – 3:06
"Queen of Clubs" – 3:17
"That's the Way (I Like It)" – 3:06
"Keep It Comin' Love" – 3:52
"Please Don't Go" – 3:48
"Boogie Shoes" – 2:12
"Let's Go Rock and Roll" – 3:34
"Give It Up" - 4:05
"Do You Wanna Go Party" – 3:47
"I Like to Do It" – 2:55
"Shotgun Shuffle" – 2:48
"Wrap Your Arms Around Me" – 3:42
"All I Want" – 4:28

Personnel
Harry Wayne Casey – keyboards, vocal
Jerome Smith – guitar
Richard Finch – bass guitar, drums, percussion
Robert Johnson – drums
Oliver Brown – percussion
Fermin Goytisolo – percussion
Ken Faulk – trumpet
Vinnie Tanno – trumpet
Mike Lewis – tenor saxophone
Whit Sidener – baritone saxophone
Beverly Champion – background vocals
Margaret Reynolds – background vocals
Jeanette Williams – background vocals

References

KC and the Sunshine Band albums
1990 greatest hits albums
Rhino Records compilation albums